Eta Gruis, Latinized from η Gruis, is a solitary star in the southern constellation of Grus. It is visible to the naked eye as a faint, orange-hued star with an apparent visual magnitude of 4.85. The star is drifting further away with a radial velocity of +28 km/s.

It is a periodic microvariable with an amplitude of 0.0055 magnitude and a frequency of 0.36118 cycles per day. With the supply of hydrogen exhausted at its core, the star has expanded and cooled, now having 31 times the Sun's girth. It is radiating 338.5 times the luminosity of the Sun from its swollen photosphere at an effective temperature of 4,420 K.

Eta Gruis has a magnitude 11.5 visual companion located at an angular separation of  along a position angle of 187°, as of 2012.

References

K-type giants
Grus (constellation)
Gruis, Eta
Durchmusterung objects
215369
112374
8655